Proaphelinoides is a genus of wasps belonging to the family Aphelinidae.

The species of this genus are found in Australia.

Species:

Proaphelinoides anomalus 
Proaphelinoides assamensis
Proaphelinoides australis 
Proaphelinoides bendovi 
Proaphelinoides elongatiformis

References

Aphelinidae